Christoph "Sumi" Sumann (19 January 1976) is a former Austrian biathlete.

Life and career
As was the case with many of his fellow biathletes, Sumann switched over from cross-country skiing, which he had been doing since childhood. By the mid-1990s had he entered junior ski team of Austria and later on progressed to senior level. He was a skillful sprinter at the time.

Sumann began as a biathlete in 2000 and would compete in biathlon at the top level for 11 seasons.

His first World Cup win came in 2002–03 season and he finished 15th in the World Cup total. In 2006–07 Biathlon World Cup Sumann won the a mass start race and wore the red bib of the leader of the mass start cup up until the last stage of the season, the fact is quite outstanding for Austrians in biathlon despite the fact that he eventually lost it to Ole Einar Bjørndalen, who thus won the mass start world cup that season.

His most brilliant season was the 2009–10 Biathlon World Cup. He won two silvers at the 2010 Winter Olympics in the relay and the pursuit, being runner-up in the World Cup total along with title in the individual cup made him one of the most decorated athletes of that season.

The 2010–11 Biathlon World Cup was fraught with hardships for Sumann since he caught intestinal disease in Östersund, Sweden in December and he had to combat it throughout the season. However, he came through at the World Championships when he won a bronze medal in the 20 km individual.

Sumann retired from the sport at the end of the 2013–14 season.

Personal life
 Coached by Gösweiner Reinhard at the club Union Sportverein Frojach-Katsch, Sumann is a policeman in his homeland. Besides, he is married and has two children, a daughter Lea and a son Felix.

Biathlon results
All results are sourced from the International Biathlon Union.

Olympic Games
3 medals (2 silver, 1 bronze)

*Mass start was added as an event in 2006, with the mixed relay being added in 2014.

World Championships
4 medals (2 silver, 2 bronze)

*During Olympic seasons competitions are only held for those events not included in the Olympic program.
**Mixed relay was added as an event in 2005.

Individual victories
6 victories (1 In, 1 Sp, 2 Pu, 2 MS)

*Results are from UIPMB and IBU races which include the Biathlon World Cup, Biathlon World Championships and the Winter Olympic Games.

References

External links
  
 
 

1976 births
Living people
People from Judenburg
Austrian male biathletes
Biathletes at the 2002 Winter Olympics
Biathletes at the 2006 Winter Olympics
Biathletes at the 2010 Winter Olympics
Biathletes at the 2014 Winter Olympics
Olympic biathletes of Austria
Medalists at the 2010 Winter Olympics
Medalists at the 2014 Winter Olympics
Olympic medalists in biathlon
Olympic bronze medalists for Austria
Olympic silver medalists for Austria
Biathlon World Championships medalists
Universiade medalists in cross-country skiing
Universiade gold medalists for Austria
Competitors at the 1999 Winter Universiade
Sportspeople from Styria